Donald McGlashan (born 18 July 1959) is a New Zealand composer, singer and multi-instrumentalist who Is best known for membership in the bands Blam Blam Blam, The Front Lawn, and The Mutton Birds, before going solo. He has also composed for cinema and television. Among other instruments, McGlashan has played guitar, drums, euphonium and French horn.

McGlashan has played with percussion group From Scratch, and bands The Bellbirds, The Plague, and composed pieces for New Zealand's Limbs Dance Company. His first hits were with band Blam Blam Blam in the early 1980s. He later released four albums as lead singer and writer for The Mutton Birds.

Biography

Early life
McGlashan was born in Auckland, New Zealand. Both his parents were teachers: his father Bain taught civil engineering at Auckland Technical Institute and his mother Alice was a schoolteacher. McGlashan was actively encouraged to pursue music from a young age by his father, who bought him various musical instruments to learn on. McGlashan wrote "Envy of Angels" as a tribute to his father.
At age seven McGlashan began on cello and piano, "then gradually added more instruments to that. [I] went through the tune-a-day for whatever instrument it was, for just about every instrument I think."

McGlashan attended Westlake Boys' High School, on Auckland's North Shore. While at high school he began playing keyboard in local bands. "I carried on sort of following those two strands – of learning how to write songs, learning how to be in a band, learning all the sort of extra musical stuff that you have to learn – and on the other side I was learning the French horn."

At the University of Auckland, McGlashan studied English and music, and played French horn and percussion in the Auckland Symphonia (later called the Auckland Philharmonia) from 1979 to 1982. McGlashan began working with Philip Dadson's percussion group From Scratch in 1979, while playing in the Auckland Symphonia. McGlashan played a number of eclectic percussion instruments, such as PVC piping struck with jandals; the name of the group came from the fact that they produced their own instruments 'from scratch'. On Standards, the album he jointly produced with Ivan Zagni for Propeller Records in 1982, he is credited as playing bass guitar, horn, whistle, percussion, marimba and vocals.

1981–1984: Blam Blam Blam

In 1981, McGlashan replaced Ian Gilroy in punk band The Whizz Kids, who rechristened themselves Blam Blam Blam. McGlashan's song "Don't Fight It Marsha, It's Bigger Than Both of Us" reached #17 in the New Zealand charts. Local music magazine Rip It Up deemed it 'best single of the year', and readers voted McGlashan drummer of the year.

1985–1990: The Front Lawn

In March 1985, a group formed for the purpose, Left, Right and Centre, released a single, "Don't Go", a protest against the proposed All Blacks tour of South Africa. The song was written by Don McGlashan, Frank Stark and Geoff Chapple. McGlashan, Chris Knox and Rick Bryant were the main vocalists.

McGlashan formed multi-media group The Front Lawn with Harry Sinclair. The duo (in their late stages a trio, thanks to the addition of actor Jennifer Ward-Lealand) won acclaim for theatre shows which combined music with physical comedy. McGlashan's song "Andy", written in memory of his late brother, was later listed among the APRA Top 100 New Zealand Songs of All Time.

McGlashan and Sinclair also made and starred in short films Walk Short (in which each played multiple roles), The Lounge Bar and 1990's Linda's Body. By now Sinclair was growing increasingly interested in directing, while McGlashan was keen to return to the live circuit. He had also begun composing for the screen.

1991–2002: The Mutton Birds

David Long moved from Wellington to Auckland to work with McGlashan, and the two began working together and auditioning drummers. After playing their first gig on St Patrick's Day 1991 with a session drummer, Steve Garden, they heard about Ross Burge and convinced him to move back to New Zealand from New York to join The Mutton Birds. The band began to become successful—"Anchor Me" won McGlashan the 1994 Silver Scroll Award—and later moved to the UK. However, while the Mutton Birds received acclaim from UK critics and music magazines, they failed to achieve mainstream success. Eventually they disbanded, and McGlashan returned to New Zealand.

2003–present: Solo work
McGlashan's first solo album, Warm Hand, was released in May 2006. It was nominated for an NZ Music Award for album of the year, and debut single "Miracle Sun" was a nominee for New Zealand's supreme songwriting award, the APRA Silver Scroll.

In March 2009, the album Marvellous Year was released through Arch Hill Records. The album is credited to Don McGlashan & the Seven Sisters, a band which had begun when he toured Warm Hand. The album included a new version of McGlashan-penned hit "Bathe in the River", with McGlashan on lead vocals.

In 2005, "Anchor Me" was re-recorded by an ensemble of NZ artists to commemorate the 20th anniversary of the Rainbow Warrior bombing. McGlashan allowed the song to be used but did not perform on it, out of the concern it would turn the attention to him instead of the event the charity song was to represent.

In 2012 McGlashan was one of a select number of artists given permission to visit Antarctica. The following year he was awarded the two-month Michael King residency.

McGlashan played euphonium on album Time On Earth, by Crowded House. He played live with the band at Glastonbury 2008 and was a regular member of the touring line-up throughout their 2008 world tour.  Later he played euphonium on track 'Hole In My Head' by Melbourne singer/songwriter Marjorie Cardwell, for her 2012 album In Another World.

In 2012, McGlashan and Dave Dobbyn partnered for the Acoustic Church Tour.

In 2015 he released his third solo album Lucky Stars, which he described as "his most personal album yet".

In 2022 he released his fourth solo album Bright November Morning which includes songs from his early days playing gigs with The Mutton Birds to his song about the 1881 invasion of Parihaka, titled John Bryce.  McGlashan said it was hard to pinpoint where the album fits in his career.

"It'd be like looking at a whole photo album of the last few years and saying this is exactly where I am, these are all the things that sort of make up who I am and who I am right now." Soon after its release the album reached the top of the New Zealand Record Album Music Charts

Soundtrack work
McGlashan began contributing to soundtracks as early as 1980, when he was one of the trio who composed the music for New Zealand police series Mortimer's Patch. McGlashan composed occasionally for the screen over the next two and a half decades, including work on Jane Campion's film An Angel at My Table; Cinema of Unease, a documentary about the history of New Zealand cinema; and long-running detective series Street Legal.

From 2005 onwards, McGlashan began to devote a lot more energy to soundtrack work. Since then he has composed the music for more than a dozen screen projects – predominantly feature films (including The Dead Lands and the orchestral soundtrack for Dean Spanley) – as well as short films (Tick) and television (Katherine Mansfield telemovie Bliss, TV series Orange Roughies).

Song "Bathe In the River" featured on McGlashan's soundtrack to acclaimed Toa Fraser film No. 2 (2006, also known as Naming Number Two). Sung by Hollie Smith, it reached number 2 on the New Zealand music charts and went platinum. The song also won him the 2006 APRA Silver Scroll Award, his second win.

In 2011 McGlashan provided the score to the fireworks during the opening ceremony of the 2011 Rugby World Cup.

Musical style
McGlashan is noted for writing lyrics that feature New Zealand imagery and vernacular, many involving his hometown of Auckland. Examples include Dominion Road in Auckland ("Dominion Road"), the Auckland Harbour Bridge ("Harbour Bridge"), Takapuna Beach ("Andy"), and the Coromandel ("Passenger 26"). The Valiant in "White Valiant" was a commonly seen car in 1970s-era New Zealand: McGlashan never owned one, though fellow musician Dave Dobbyn did.

McGlashan is also known for writing about real-life events and people, including:
 The 1990 Aramoana massacre ("A Thing Well Made")
 the 1993 Kader Toy Factory Fire in Thailand ("Toy Factory Fire")
 Opo the dolphin ("Miracle Sun")
 John Bryce and his invasion of Parihaka ("John Bryce")
 Polar explorer Sir Ernest Shackleton ("Shackleton")

McGlashan noted that while living in England as a member of the Mutton Birds, he still wrote "letters to home" to New Zealand in his songs, as he struggled to find a connection with English imagery.

In 1998 McGlashan explained his writing process as "trying to write about people that I know. I suppose 'write letters' to people, or try to unpick a moment that I’ve lived through and either tell the story in the first person or make up some characters who then tell the story in their own words – and by using what they don’t say as much as what they do say, try and paint their world in a song."

He has also played a number of different instruments throughout his musical career: asked what instruments he plays, he answered, "Well I don't play violin". However, he is noted for playing the euphonium and French horn. With Blam Blam Blam, McGlashan played drums and euphonium. He later picked up guitar duties for his work with The Front Lawn and The Mutton Birds.

Discography

Albums

With From Scratch

 From Scratch Perform Rhythm Works (1979) self-released
 3 Pieces From Gung Ho 1,2,3D (1983) Hit Singles
 Pacific 3,2,1,zero (Part 1) – Drum/Sing (1985) Flying Nun Records
 Gung Ho 1,2,3D (1988) Flying Nun Records

With Blam Blam Blam

 Luxury Length (1982) Propeller Records/Festival Records

With The Front Lawn

 Songs from The Front Lawn (1989) Front Lawn Records
 More Songs from The Front Lawn (1993) Virgin Records

With The Mutton Birds

 The Mutton Birds (1992) Bag Records
 Salty (1993) EMI Records
 Envy of Angels (1996) EMI Records
 Rain, Steam and Speed (1999) Shhh! Records
 Flock: The Best of the Mutton Birds (2002) EMI Records

Soundtracks

Movies
 Other Halves (NZ 1984)
 The Grasscutter (NZ/UK 1988) (with Wayne Laird)
 An Angel at My Table (NZ 1990)
 Cinema of Unease (UK/NZ 1995)
 Like It Is (UK 1998)
 No. 2 (NZ 2005)
 Out of the Blue (Song: "I Will Not Let You Down") (NZ 2006)
 The Tattooist (Song: "I Will Not Let You Down") (NZ 2007)
 Dean Spanley (UK/NZ 2008)
 Show Of Hands (NZ 2008)
 Matariki – (NZ 2010)
 Kiwi Flyer (NZ 2012)
 The Dead Lands (NZ/UK 2014)

Short films
 "The Lounge Bar" (1989) (as The Front Lawn)
 "Linda's Body" (1990) (as The Front Lawn)
 "The Painted Lady" (2000)
 "Tick" (2002)

TV
 Mortimer's Patch (NZ 1979) (with Wayne Laird and Keith Hunter)
 Terry and the Gunrunners (NZ 1985)
 Street Legal (NZ 2000–)
 Orange Roughies (NZ 2006)
 This Is Not My Life (NZ 2010)
 RocKwiz contestant and guest (episode 94), along with Jenny Morris
 Kiri and Lou (2019– ) (NZ/Canada)

Acting in film

Shorts
The Front Lawn:
 "Walkshort" (NZ 1987)all the characters were played by Don McGlashan and Harry Sinclair.
 "The Lounge Bar" (NZ 1989) Don McGlashan – Mike
 "Linda's Body" (NZ 1990) Don McGlashan – Ben

Feature film
 Perfect Strangers (NZ 2003): singing "Anchor Me" with band in bar.

Theatre
Co-founder of Watershed Theatre, Auckland 1990 (disbanded 1995)
Play 2, Maidment Studio Theatre, October 2002: Don McGlashan played a choirmaster.

Dance

Music for Limbs Dance Company
New Zealand
 "Arcade" (1981)
 "This Is A Love Song" (1983)
 "Decoy" (1984)
 "Souvenirs" (1984)
 "Vigil Switch" (1985)
 "Now Is The Hour" (1988)

Laura Dean Dancers and Musicians
New York, 1983
 He co-composed the scores to two new Dean pieces
 Later appointed music rehearsal director.
 Toured with the company on US and European tours, playing drums and synthesiser.

Awards

New Zealand Music Awards

|-
| rowspan="2" | 1981
| Blam Blam Blam – "No Depression in New Zealand"
| Single of the Year
|  
|-
| Blam Blam Blam
| Most Promising Group
| 
|-
| rowspan="4" | 1989
| The Front Lawn – Songs from The Front Lawn
| Album of the Year
|  
|-
| The Front Lawn
| Most Promising Group
| 
|-
| The Front Lawn
| International Achievement
| 
|-
| The Front Lawn
| Best Film Soundtrack/Compilation
| 
|-
| rowspan="4" | 1993
| The Mutton Birds – The Mutton Birds
| Album of the Year
|  
|-
| The Mutton Birds – Nature
| Single of the Year
| 
|-
| The Mutton Birds
| Best Group
| 
|-
| Fane Flaws and The Mutton Birds – "Nature" (The Mutton Birds)
| Best Video
| 
|-
| rowspan="3" | 1995
| The Mutton Birds – Salty
| Album of the Year
|  
|-
| The Mutton Birds
| Best Group
| 
|-
| Don McGlashan – "Anchor Me"
| Best Songwriter
| 
|-
| 1996
| The Mutton Birds
| Best Group
|  
|-
| rowspan="3" | 1997
| The Mutton Birds – Envy of Angels
| Album of the Year
|  
|-
| The Mutton Birds – "She's Been Talking"
| Single of the Year
| 
|-
| The Mutton Birds
| Best Group
| 
|-
| rowspan="2" | 1998
| The Mutton Birds
| Best Group
|  
|-
| International Achievement
| Best Group
| 
|-
| rowspan="3" | 2000
| The Mutton Birds – Rain, Steam and Speed
| Album of the Year
|  
|-
| The Mutton Birds – "Pulled Along By Love"
| Single of the Year
| 
|-
| Don McGlashan (The Mutton Birds)
| Top Male Vocalist
| 
|-
| rowspan="3" | 2006
| Don McGlashan – Warm Hand
| Album of the Year
|  
|-
| Don McGlashan – Warm Hand
| Best Male Solo Artist
| 
|-
| Don McGlashan, Sean Donnelly, Ed McWilliams – Warm Hand (Don McGlashan)
| Best Producer
| 
|-
| rowspan="2" | 2009
| Don McGlashan and the Seven Sisters
| Best Male Solo Artist
|  
|-
| Don McGlashan, Sean Donnelly – Marvellous Year
| Best Producer
| 
|}

Silver Scrolls
McGlashan has won the APRA Silver Scroll twice. In 2006, McGlashan had two songs nominated for this award – a feat last achieved by Dave Dobbyn in 1995. "Bathe in the River", written by McGlashan for the film No. 2, later won the award.

In 2001, a vote by members of APRA to find New Zealand's Top 100 songs (what would eventually become the Nature's Best series) included 5 McGlashan songs. These were:

 23:  The Mutton Birds – "Dominion Road"
 49: The Mutton Birds – "Anchor Me"	
 66: Blam Blam Blam – "Don't Fight It Marsha, It's Bigger Than Both of Us"	
 69: Blam Blam Blam – "There Is No Depression in New Zealand"
 82: The Front Lawn – "Andy" (co-written with Harry Sinclair)

Other awards

 2001 – University of Auckland Literary Fellowship.
 2002 – Arts Foundation of New Zealand Laureate Award.
 2003 – New Zealand Television Awards, Best Original Music for Street Legal.
 2007 – Auckland City Council Living Legend Award.
 2012 – University of Auckland Distinguished Alumni Award.
 2012 – Antarctica New Zealand's Writers and Artists residency programme.
 2013 – Michael King Writer's Centre Writer in Residence.

Personal life
McGlashan married dancer and writer Marianne Schultz in 1989. The couple separated in 2012, and divorced in 2017.  They have two children, Louie and Moe. McGlashan married Ann McDonell in 2018.

In 2008 McGlashan was angered that TVNZ had used a song performed by the Mutton Birds ("Anchor Me") when the election results showed that the National Party had won the New Zealand elections.
McGlashan stated that he "would rather have sex with a very ugly crayfish" than let the National Party use his music. The song had been used by TVNZ in terms of the Australasian Performing Right Association's blanket licence with TVNZ.

On 28 March 2011 McGlashan suffered three broken ribs, a punctured lung, and a broken collarbone after he hit a car door while cycling down Dominion Road, Auckland. He was hospitalised.

References

Other sources
 Chunn, Mike and Chunn, Jeremy, The Mechanics of Popular Music, A New Zealand Perspective, GP Publications, 1995. 
 Dennis, Jonathan and Bieringa, Jan (eds), Film in Aotearoa New Zealand, Victoria University Press, 2nd Edition, 1996. 
 Dix, John, Stranded in Paradise, Penguin, 2005. 
 Eggleton, David, Ready To Fly, Craig Potton, 2003. 
 Martin, Helen and Edwards, Sam, New Zealand Film 1912–1996, Oxford, 1997. 
 Shute, Gareth, NZ Rock 1987–2007, Auckland, Random House, 2008. 
 Spittle, Gordon, Counting The Beat, GP Publications, 1997.

External links
Don McGlashan – Official Home Page (2007 archived version)
Don McGlashan – Mana Music (2006 archived version)
Don McGlashan – Laureate Artist 2002, Arts Foundation of New Zealand

 1998 Radio New Zealand "Musical Chairs" interview (reposted on Geocities) (archived)
"Don't Go", Right, Left and Centre, Music Video – 1985 (NZ On Screen)

1959 births
APRA Award winners
Living people
People educated at Westlake Boys High School
New Zealand film score composers
New Zealand songwriters
Male songwriters
Musicians from Auckland
Male film score composers